The CCHA Player of the Year is an annual award given out at the conclusion of the Central Collegiate Hockey Association regular season to the best player in the conference as voted by the coaches of each CCHA team. The award went on hiatus after the original CCHA was disbanded after the 2012–13 season, and was reinstated when the league resumed play in 2021–22.

The Player of the Year was first awarded in 1977 and every year thereafter until 2013, when the original CCHA was dissolved as a consequence of the Big Ten Conference forming its men's ice hockey conference. The award returned along with the league in 2022.

Two players (Brendan Morrison and Ryan Miller) have received the award two separate times, both doing so in consecutive years.

Award winners

Winners by school

Winners by position

See also
CCHA Awards

References

General

Specific

External links
CCHA Awards (Incomplete) 

College ice hockey player of the year awards in the United States
Player of the Year